Corbin is an unincorporated community in Caroline County, in the U.S. state of Virginia.

The Santee plantation was placed on the National Register of Historic Places in 1979.

Climate
The climate in this area is characterized by hot, humid summers and generally mild to cool winters.  According to the Köppen Climate Classification system, Corbin has a humid subtropical climate, abbreviated "Cfa" on climate maps.

References

Unincorporated communities in Virginia
Unincorporated communities in Caroline County, Virginia